LDLC OL is a French esports organization with players competing in Counter-Strike: Global Offensive, Fortnite Battle Royale, League of Legends, PlayerUnknown's Battlegrounds and World Rally Championship.

On January 7, 2020, Team LDLC officially renamed to LDLC OL, following an announcement of partnership with the French football club Olympique Lyonnais.

History

Counter-Strike: Global Offensive 
LDLC placed 5–8th at the CS:GO Major EMS One Katowice 2014. They later won the CS:GO Major DreamHack Winter 2014 in November. Team LDLC's Counter-Strike team won the X Games CS:GO tournament in January 2015. On 2 February, LDLC's roster left the team and was acquired by Team EnVyUs.

On 27 February, the team announced that it had signed the former Awsomiac squad whose players were Kevin "madc" Ducourtioux, Charbel "BouLy" Naoum, David "HEdm" Thalien, Guillame "XpG" Veron, and Julien "PetitSkel" Marcantoni.

Shortly after competing at ESL One Cologne 2014 as a player for Team LDLC, Hovik "KQLY" Tovmassian received a Valve Anti-Cheat ban for Counter-Strike: Global Offensive, permanently restricting his account from playing. The timing of the ban caused speculation among followers of the game's professional play that his performance at the tournament was influenced by cheating software. Tovmassian took an opportunity shortly after the incident to state he had not cheated during any LAN tournaments.

In March 2015, LDLC signed the Platinum Esports roster as a second CS:GO team, dubbed LDLC Blue.

In November 2017, Team LDLC won  the ESWC 2017 at  the Paris Games Week after already winning in 2015.

League of Legends 
On 28 November 2019, Markos "Comp" Stamkopoulos left the team, leaving it without an active League of Legends roster.

Rally games 
Nexl is a successful e-sport competitor who has received coverage from the media.

Current rosters

Organization

References

External links 
 

Esports teams based in France
Counter-Strike teams
FIFA (video game series) teams
European Regional League teams